White Marsh is an unincorporated community in Gloucester County, in the U. S. state of Virginia. White Marsh has a post office with ZIP code 23183.

Abingdon Church and the Fairfield Site are listed on the National Register of Historic Places.

References

Unincorporated communities in Virginia
Unincorporated communities in Gloucester County, Virginia